Besançon Franche-Comté TGV station (French: Gare de Besançon Franche-Comté TGV) is a French high speed railway station located in Les Auxons, Doubs, eastern France. The station was opened in 2011 and is located on the LGV Rhin-Rhône and Besançon-Viotte-Vesoul railway connecting railway. The train services are operated by SNCF. It serves the city of Besançon (10 km south) and surrounding areas.

Train services
From Besançon Franche-Comté TGV train services depart to major French cities such as: Paris, Dijon, Belfort, Mulhouse, Strasbourg, Lyon, Marseille, Montpellier and Lille. International services operate to Germany: Frankfurt (Main) Hbf.

Bus services
Bus services are operated by Besançon operator Ginko.

60 Besançon Temis - École Valentin - Miserey Salines - Gare Besançon Franche-Comté TGV.
68 Tallenay - Chatillon-le-Duc - Gare Besançon Franche-Comté TGV.
69 Pirey - Pouilley-les-Vignes - Pelousey - Auxon-Dessous - Auxon-Dessus - Gare Besançon Franche-Comté TGV

References

External links

The station on ter-sncf.com 

Railway stations in France opened in 2011
Railway stations in Doubs